Andrea Lee may refer to:

 Andrea Lee (author) (born 1953), American author
 Andrea Lee (squash player) (born 1998), Malaysian squash player
 Andrea Lee (fighter)  (born 1989), American fighter
 Andrea Lee (golfer), American golfer